Emblemariopsis diaphana, the glass blenny, is a species of chaenopsid blenny found in coral reefs in the Florida Keys, USA, in the western central Atlantic ocean. It can reach a maximum length of  TL. The specific name refers to this species being "largely translucent" in life, although this is lost in preserved specimens. E. diaphana is the type species of the genus Emblemariopsis.

References
 Longley, W.H., 1927 (Dec.) Observations upon the ecology of Tortugas fishes with notes upon the taxonomy of species new or little known. (Definition of three new genera and two species). Carnegie Institution of Washington Year Book No. 26: 222–224.

diaphana
Taxa named by William Harding Longley
Fish described in 1927